Cranberry Township is the name of some places in the U.S. state of Pennsylvania:
Cranberry Township, Butler County, Pennsylvania
Cranberry Township, Venango County, Pennsylvania

Pennsylvania township disambiguation pages